Quenneville is a surname. Notable people with the name include:

 Claude Quenneville, Canadian sports commentator
 Jason Quenneville(born 1982), Canadian record producer
 Joel Quenneville (born 1958), Canadian-American ice hockey coach
 John Quenneville (born 1996), Canadian ice hockey player
 Leo Quenneville (1900–1986), Canadian ice hockey player